Pirasmillu (also Romanized as Pīrāsmīllū; also known as Perūs Mūl and Pīrāsmellū) is a village in Chahardangeh Rural District, Hurand District, Ahar County, East Azerbaijan Province, Iran. At the 2006 census, its population was 117, in 26 families.

References 

Populated places in Ahar County